The Mercedes-AMG ONE (R50, previously known as Project One) is a limited-production plug-in hybrid sports car manufactured by Mercedes-AMG, featuring Formula One-derived technology. It was unveiled at the 2017 International Motor Show Germany by Mercedes-AMG Petronas F1 driver Lewis Hamilton and Head of Mercedes-Benz Dieter Zetsche.

On June 1, 2022, Mercedes-AMG revealed the production version of the AMG ONE. Production of the car began in August 2022. Currently, the car is the cover car for Forza Horizon 5.

Development 
AMG unveiled the concept version of the ONE, called the Project One, with nearly identical specifications to the production version. The production ONE will be evaluated on their performance, durability, and ability in Mercedes-Benz's proving grounds and on racing circuits. The head of Mercedes-AMG, Tobias Moers states that when "the time is right", Mercedes-AMG Petronas F1 team driver and seven-time world champion Lewis Hamilton, who has worked on the development of the car, will test the prototypes.

Production 
The production version of the AMG ONE unveiled on June 1, 2022. Production is expected to begin in late 2022 and planned to be 275 units at a price of USD $2.72 million per unit, all of which have been already sold. Mercedes-AMG received orders more than four times of the production number, but have stated that production will not be increased from the planned 275 units, in order to maintain the exclusivity of the car. Production of the car began in August 2022, all 275 cars to be hand built by Mercedes-AMG, with deliveries to begin in late 2022. The first car was delivered on January 16, 2023, which had an exclusive paint job inspired by the livery of Mercedes-AMG F1 W12 E Performance.

Seven-time Formula One World Champion Lewis Hamilton purchased two AMG ONEs, of which one is to be gifted to his father Anthony. Other owners of the AMG ONE include former Formula One driver David Coulthard, 2016 Formula One World Champion Nico Rosberg, real estate mogul Manny Khoshbin, former tennis player Ion Țiriac and actor Mark Wahlberg.

Specifications

Exterior features 

The exterior of the car is designed primarily for aerodynamics. Notable aerodynamic features includes the moveable slats which were specifically developed for the front wheelhouses, two-part extendable rear wing with DRS system and active flaps on the front diffuser which were adjustable to suit the driver’s chosen driving programme. Additionally, the large front air inlets, the roof-mounted air intake, the large aerodynamic fin extending down the back half of the car and aerodynamically optimized wheels helps the car to generate more downforce for carry maximum speed at highspeed corners.

Powertrain 
The powertrain of the Mercedes-AMG ONE is rated at  through a hybrid drivetrain that shares many features with modern Formula One cars. The car has five motors with different functions on board: one internal combustion engine (ICE) and four electric motors.

Internal combustion engine 

The Mercedes-AMG ONE will utilise a modified Mercedes-Benz PU106B Hybrid engine, a 1.6-litre turbocharged 90-degree V6 engine from the Mercedes-AMG F1 W06 Formula One car, as confirmed by Mercedes-AMG board member Ola Källenius. Modifications will be done to the engine due to the engine's illegality in RPM idle and redline. The head of Mercedes-AMG, Tobias Moers, states that the engine will be at 1,280 rpm when idle, and at 11,000 rpm when at its redline limit. The ICE produces , with torque figures unknown because of the complex drivetrain. The top speed of this car is 219 mph (352 km/h).

Electric motors 
The internal combustion engine will work in conjunction with four electric motors: a  Motor Generator Unit-Kinetic (MGU-K) coupled to the crankshaft, a  Motor Generator Unit-Heat (MGU-H) coupled to the turbocharger, and two  electric motors at the front axle. The MGU-K and MGU-H are Formula One-style motors responsible for recovering energy and improving efficiency during operation of the car. More specifically, the MGU-K serves to generate electricity during braking, while the MGU-H serves to eliminate turbocharger lag, improve throttle response by keeping the turbine spinning at high speeds and to recover wasted energy from the exhaust. The final two electric motors drive the front wheels to allow for an all-wheel drive drivetrain, and the sum of these four electric motors will contribute  effective power to the total power output figure of the ONE.

Transmission 
The transmission will be a 7-speed single-clutch automated manual transmission with 4-disc  carbon racing clutch (similar to the type of transmission used in modern Formula One cars), and will deliver the bulk of the engine power and torque to the rear wheels. The use of a single-clutch over a dual-clutch transmission was due to AMG's engineers wanting to keep the car light and due to concerns over the dual-clutch's ability to handle the high-revving V6 ICE.

Suspension and wheels 
The ONE features a five-link aluminium coil-over suspension setup with two transverse adjustable push-rod spring struts with adaptive damping adjustment, while in the rear axle links are shaped for better aerodynamics. The car also features the Hydraulic AMG carbon-fibre ceramic high-performance composite brake system, with 398 x 38 mm front composite brake discs, ventilated with 6-piston aluminium fixed callipers. 380 x 34 mm rear composite brake discs, ventilated with 4-piston aluminium fixed callipers. Additionally electric parking brake, ABS, Brake Assist and 3-stage ESP were also offered for the car.

The ONE also has unique 10-spoke forged aluminium alloy and NACA carbon fibre openings for brake cooling and increase downforce. Also, with diameters of 19 inches at the front and 20 inches at the rear with centre-lock wheel nuts. The tyres are Michelin Pilot Sport Cup 2Rs with codes of 285/35 ZR 19 for the front and 335/30 ZR 20 for the rear. The brakes are ventilated carbon-ceramic discs.

Interior features 

The interior is mostly minimalist and driver-focused, continuing the Formula One theme of the ONE. This includes AMG Motorsport bucket seats, integrated into the carbon monocoque, a Formula One-style steering wheel with knobs for driving programmes including Drag Reduction System (DRS) and pedals, and a driver-oriented central infotainment screen. There are some traditional luxury features in the interior, notably napa leather and hand stitching on the bucket seats.

Chassis 

The car also features the Formula One inspired exhaust tailpipe with its large round outlet and two other smaller outlets.

Performance 

The ONE has six different drive modes. Starting with "Race Safe" mode, which features a hybrid driving mode with all-electric start up. The ICE will switch on only when a higher power is required. The "Race" mode is also a hybrid driving mode with a special charging strategy. Also, with a continuous combustion engine run and battery charging. The "EV" mode is an all-electric driving mode. "Race Plus" mode features active aerodynamics, front diffuser flaps folds up to shape, rear wing is fully extended, louvers (front fenders vents) opens up, lowers the car by 37 mm in front and 30 mm in rear, chassis tuning and special performance management. "Strat 2" mode, which features all "Race Plus" changes, additionally with firmer suspension tuning and full electric power from all electric motors. This is a similar driving mode for those were in use in Formula One cars during qualifying sessions. The "Individual" mode allows the driver to set the car settings as per their personal preferences.

In "Race Plus" and "Strat 2" modes, the total vehicle downforce increases by up to five times when compared to other drive modes. Also, the ONE features Formula One's Drag Reduction System (DRS). Reducing the vehicle's overall downforce by 20 percent from lowering the rear wing flaps and closing the front louvers to increase straight line speed. DRS can be turned off by manually and automatically from applying brakes.

Official standstill acceleration times by manufacturer,

Top speed: 
0-: 2.9 seconds
0-: 7.0 seconds
0-: 15.6 seconds

Lap records
In November 2022, the AMG One set a lap time of 6:35.183 minutes at the Nürburgring Nordschleife 12.944 mile (20.832 km) course. Driven by Maro Engel, it became the fastest road-legal production car around the track, beating the previous record by over 13 seconds, which was held by the Mercedes-AMG GT Black Series. Engel revealed, the track wasn't in ideal conditions while the lap was done, claimed some parts of the track were still on damp conditions and he had to lift the throttle at those particular corners. Mercedes-AMG claimed the car could have easily done a sub 6:30 minute lap time, if the track was in ideal conditions.

Following the Nürburgring Nordschleife lap record, Mercedes-AMG revealed, the AMG One have set new lap records around the Nürburgring Grand Prix circuit, Hockenheimring and Red Bull Ring, setting lap times of 1:56.096 minutes, 1:38.563 minutes and 1:26.846 minutes respectively.

See also 
 List of production cars by power output

References

External links 

 

One
Mercedes AMG Project One
Cars introduced in 2021
Hybrid electric cars
Plug-in hybrid vehicles
Rear mid-engine, all-wheel-drive vehicles